Dirk Claes (born 1959) is a Belgian politician and a member of the CD&V. He was elected as a member of the Belgian Senate in 2007.

Notes

Living people
Christian Democratic and Flemish politicians
Members of the Belgian Federal Parliament
1959 births
21st-century Belgian politicians

Mayors of places in Belgium